Håkan Pettersson is a Swedish orienteering competitor.

He received a silver medal in the sprint distance at the 2002 European Orienteering Championships in Sümeg.

He is junior world champion in the classic distance from 1998.

References

Year of birth missing (living people)
Living people
Swedish orienteers
Male orienteers
Foot orienteers
Junior World Orienteering Championships medalists